Tetyra bipunctata, the shieldbacked pine seed bug, is a species of shield-backed bug in the family Scutelleridae. It is found in Central America and North America.

References

External links

 

Scutelleridae
Articles created by Qbugbot
Insects described in 1839